Francisco de Paula Victor (11 November 1935 – 21 November 2018) was a Brazilian Roman Catholic bishop.

Biography 

He was born in Paraisópolis in 1935, and he graduated in Chemistry at Federal University of Minas Gerais and was ordained to the priesthood in 1990.

He served as titular bishop of Turres in Numidia and as auxiliary bishop of the Roman Catholic Archdiocese of Brasilia, Brazil, from 1996 to 2018.

Notes

1935 births
2018 deaths
21st-century Roman Catholic bishops in Brazil
20th-century Roman Catholic bishops in Brazil
Roman Catholic bishops of Brasília